Henry Porter (born ca. 1613) was an English politician who sat in the House of Commons  in 1654 and 1656.

Porter was the eldest son of James Porter of Lancaster. He was a major in the service of the commonwealth. In 1654, he was elected Member of Parliament for Lancaster in the First Protectorate Parliament. He was re-elected MP for Lancaster in 1656 to the Second Protectorate Parliament

Porter was given as aged 52 in 1665.

Porter had a son Henry who was also MP for Lancaster.

References

1613 births
Year of death missing
People from Lancaster, Lancashire
English MPs 1654–1655
English MPs 1656–1658